Freda James and Kay Stammers successfully defended their title, defeating Sarah Fabyan and Helen Jacobs in the final, 6–2, 6–1 to win the ladies' doubles tennis title at the 1936 Wimbledon Championships.

Seeds

  Freda James /  Kay Stammers (champions)
  Sarah Fabyan /  Helen Jacobs (final)
  Simonne Mathieu /  Billie Yorke (quarterfinals)
  Jadwiga Jędrzejowska /  Susan Noel (quarterfinals)

Draw

Finals

Top half

Section 1

The nationalities of Mrs Clara Black, Mrs GL Baker and Mrs EA Kemp are unknown.

Section 2

Bottom half

Section 3

The nationalities of M Parr and WE Sargeant are unknown.

Section 4

References

External links

Women's Doubles
Wimbledon Championship by year – Women's doubles
Wimbledon Championships - Doubles
Wimbledon Championships - Doubles